Listok Rabotnika (The Worker's Paper) was a non-periodical newspaper of the Russian Empire, published from 1896 to 1898 in Geneva. It was an organ of the Union of Russian Social Democrats Abroad.

The newspaper published ten issues, the first eight under the direction of Emancipation of Labour group. Because the majority of the Union shifted towards the Economists, the last two numbers were not published under the direction of Emancipation of Labour, but under the Economists instead.

References

External links 
All the issues of Listok Rabotnika (in Russian) at the Internet Archive.

Newspapers published in the Russian Empire
Publications established in 1896
Publications disestablished in 1898
Defunct newspapers published in Russia
Russian-language newspapers